Pets is an adult British puppet sitcom, produced by Fit2Fill Productions Limited. It was originally aired on Channel 4 and ran for two series, the first being broadcast in 2001, and the second in 2002. It was also sold to Fox in Australia, MTV in Italy, and the Middle East.

The series was created and written by Andrew Barclay and Brian West (pen name Brian Luff), who had previously worked together at the Edinburgh Festival, winning an award for an advert for The Jerry Springer Show, and on the sketch show We Know Where You Live.

A total of 26 episodes of Pets were aired, all approximately 11 minutes long. They were shown in the early hours of the morning, and as a result, the series was fairly unknown, although it did gain a significant cult following. There was a demand on the official website for Pets to be released on DVD. Eventually a limited edition DVD was made available to purchase via the official website. As well as the two series, the DVD included two unbroadcast episodes, a clip show named "The Trials Of Hamish", and a behind-the-scenes special named "The Making Of Pets".

Several episodes of Pets are currently available as a free podcast downloadable via iTunes.

Subject matter
Pets focuses on the everyday lives of four anthropomorphic domestic animals and their dysfunctional interactions with each other. They live in a filthy, rundown house, although it has working electricity and running water. There is never a human owner visible or even mentioned.

The episodes are set entirely within the house and self-contained; events from previous episodes are never referred to, but unseen ones from the past often are. Most of the situations that take place tend to be surreal, contain strong elements of black comedy and off-colour humour, and frequently make references to pop culture subjects.

Pets also follows a rather traditional sitcom technique by using a "reset button". Each of the Pets have died at least once, only to reappear alive and well in the next episode.

Characters
Hamish, voiced by Ian Angus Wilkie, is a large Red Setter. He is well-spoken and the most intellectually-minded of the Pets, often seen reading books or newspapers. On the flipside, however, he is also frequently uptight, sarcastic, has a short temper, and longs to be in more intelligent, cultured, and dignified company than the rest of the Pets household.

Trevor, voiced by Andrew Barclay, is a small, grey bulldog. He is foul-mouthed, irritable, extremely perverted and spends most of his time eating and masturbating. He has a large collection of hardcore pornography and is often seen humping items of furniture. He can be rather intelligent and eloquent at times, but does not take these traits seriously, being more content in engaging in other very crude activities, including drinking out of the toilet with a curly straw and smearing the walls with his own faeces. He speaks in a gruff Cockney accent. He has no sense of hygiene and has had the same two tapeworms in his stomach since the late 1970s. The worms, also voiced by Barclay and Luff, converse about a wide range of subjects, from ABBA to the Kennedy assassination.

Davina, voiced by Sally Elsden, is a Persian blue cat. She is cynical, sardonic, suffers from clinical depression and is addicted to her medication. She has a large collection of bloodstained plastic bags, all of which seem to contain some kind of furry animal. She puts these bags under the floorboards, or attempts to flush down the toilet. She has a boyfriend named Vince; an unseen tomcat who constantly travels alone over many parts of the world. However, he still sends her messages about his pursuits that often imply that he is cheating on her, which she bitterly discusses directly to the camera about, ultimately ending in her plotting twisted methods on how she will murder him when he returns.

JP, voiced by Petros Emmanuel, is a parrot. He has no feathers, since losing to Trevor in a card game where he bet his entire plumage on a pair of fours. He also has two different coloured eyes and can not fly. He has a pet himself, a goldfish who has obviously been dead for a long time, although he does not acknowledge this, and continues to dote on it. He is extremely eccentric, perpetually cheerful and lives in a fantasy world of his own, often rambling on directly to the camera about subjects or individuals related to the episodes' themes. He speaks in an Afrikaans accent, and has a tendency to intersperse his dialogue with (occasionally irrelevant and obscene) phrases in the language. He also enjoys drinking his own urine, a fact which he states in almost every episode, and has an unreturned infatuation with Davina.

Iestyn Evans, Mark Mander, Garry Rutter, Mandy Travis and Martin Weinling performed the puppets in Pets, swapping characters scene-by-scene. The puppets were designed and built by Iestyn Evans and Andy Heath.

Episode list

Series 1 (2001)

Series 2 (2002)

References

External links
Pets Web Site
Pets at British Comedy Guide

2000s British sitcoms
British television shows featuring puppetry
English-language television shows
Television shows involved in plagiarism controversies
2001 British television series debuts
2002 British television series endings
Channel 4 sitcoms
Television series about birds
Television series about cats
Television shows about dogs